Alfred Miles may refer to:

Alfred Henry Miles (1848–1929), English author, editor, anthologist, journalist, composer, and lecturer
Alf Miles (1884–1926), English footballer
Alfred Hart Miles, US Navy officer, lyricist of the US Naval Academy fight song "Anchors Aweigh"
Alfred Miles (GC) (1899–1989), able seaman aboard  and George Cross recipient
Alfred B. Miles (1888–1962), biology and physiology professor and American football, basketball, and baseball coach